The Lord Deputy was the representative of the monarch and head of the Irish executive under English rule, during the Lordship of Ireland and then the Kingdom of Ireland. He deputised prior to 1523 for the Viceroy of Ireland. The plural form is Lords Deputy.

List of Lords Deputy

Lordship of Ireland 
Sir Thomas  de la Dale (1365-1366)
Sir Thomas Mortimer (1382–1383)
Thomas FitzGerald, 7th Earl of Kildare (1454–1459)
William Sherwood (1462)
Thomas FitzGerald, 7th Earl of Desmond (1463–1467)
John Tiptoft, 1st Earl of Worcester (1467–1468)
Thomas FitzGerald, 7th Earl of Kildare (1468–1475)
William Sherwood (1475–1477)
Gerald FitzGerald, 8th Earl of Kildare (1477)
Henry Grey, 4th (7th) Baron Grey of Codnor (1478–1479)
Gerald FitzGerald, 8th Earl of Kildare (1479–?1494)
Walter Fitzsimon, Archbishop of Dublin (1492)
Robert Preston, 1st Viscount Gormanston (1493–1494)
Edward Poynings (1494–1496)
Gerald FitzGerald, 8th Earl of Kildare (1496–1513)
Gerald FitzGerald, 9th Earl of Kildare (1513–1518)
Sir Maurice Fitzgerald 
Thomas Howard, Earl of Surrey (1520–1522)
Piers Butler, 8th Earl of Ormonde (1522–1524)
 Gerald FitzGerald, 9th Earl of Kildare (1524–1529)
Sir William Skeffington (1529–1532)
Gerald FitzGerald, 9th Earl of Kildare (1532–1534)
Sir William Skeffington (1534–1535)
Leonard Grey, 1st Viscount Grane (1536–1540)

Kingdom of Ireland
Anthony St Leger (1540–1548)
Edward Bellingham (1548–1549)
Lord Justices (1549–1550)
Anthony St Leger (1550–1551)
James Croft (1551–1552)
Lord Justices (1552–1553)
Anthony St Leger (1553–1556)
Thomas Radclyffe, 3rd Earl of Sussex (1556–1558) (Lord Lieutenant 1560–1564)
Sir Nicholas Arnold (1564–1565)
Sir Henry Sidney (1565–1571) (1575–1578)
William FitzWilliam (1571–1575)  (1588–1594)
Arthur Grey, 14th Baron Grey de Wilton (1580–1582)
Sir John Perrot (1584–1588)
William Russell, 1st Baron Russell of Thornhaugh (1594–1597)
Thomas Burgh, 7th Baron Strabolgi (1597)
Robert Devereux, 2nd Earl of Essex  (Lord Lieutenant 1599)
Charles Blount, Baron Mountjoy (later 1st Earl of Devonshire) (1600–1603) (Lord Lieutenant 1603–1604)
Sir George Cary (1603–1604)
Arthur Chichester, 1st Baron Chichester (1605–1616)
Sir Oliver St John (1616–1622)
Henry Cary, 1st Viscount Falkland (1622–1629)
Thomas Wentworth, 1st Earl of Strafford (1632–1640)
Christopher Wandesford (1640)
Robert Sidney, 2nd Earl of Leicester (1640–1643) (Lord Lieutenant)
James Butler, 1st Duke of Ormond (1644–1650) (Lord Lieutenant)
Henry Ireton (1650–1651)
Charles Fleetwood (1652–1657)
Henry Cromwell (1657–1658) (Lord Lieutenant 1658–1659)
Edmund Ludlow (1659–1660)
George Monck, 1st Duke of Albemarle (1660-1661) 
James Butler, 1st Duke of Ormonde (1662-1668)
 Thomas Butler, 6th Earl of Ossory (1668-1669)
 John Robartes, 1st Earl of Radnor (1669-1670)
 John Berkeley, 1st Baron Berkeley of Stratton (1670-1672)
 Arthur Capell, 1st Earl of Essex (1672-1677)
 James Butler, 1st Duke of Ormonde (1677-1682)
 Richard Butler, 1st Earl of Arran (1682-1684)
 James Butler, 1st Duke of Ormonde (1684-1685)
 Lords Justices: 24 February 1685
Henry Hyde, 2nd Earl of Clarendon (1685-1687) 
Richard Talbot, 1st Earl of Tyrconnell (1687–1688)

The title subsequently became Lord Lieutenant of Ireland, with the holder also known informally as the Viceroy.

References

Lordship of Ireland
Heads of state of Ireland
Early Modern Ireland